The Uniting Fore Care Classic was a golf tournament on the Champions Tour from 1982 to 2002. It was played in Park City, Utah, at the Jeremy Ranch Golf Club (1982–1992) and the Park Meadows Golf Club (1993–2002). It was played at stroke play each year except in 2002 when it used a Modified Stableford scoring system. From 1983 to 1986, it was an unofficial tournament that paired a Senior PGA Tour player with a PGA Tour player in a two-man best-ball format.

Seven-time PGA Tour winner Bert Yancey died of a heart attack shortly before he was to tee it up in the 1994 edition of the tournament which was eventually won by his friend, Tom Weiskopf. Afterwards Weiskopf said he planned to have Yancey's name engraved on the tournament trophy not just his own.

The purse for the 2002 tournament was US$1,500,000, with $225,000 going to the winner. The tournament was founded in 1982 as the Shootout at Jeremy Ranch.

Winners
Uniting Fore Care Classic presented by Novell
2002 Morris Hatalsky

Novell Utah Showdown
2001 Steve Veriato
2000 Doug Tewell
1999 Dave Eichelberger

Utah Showdown presented by Smith's
1998 Gil Morgan

Franklin Quest Championship
1997 Dave Stockton
1996 Graham Marsh
1995 Tony Jacklin
1994 Tom Weiskopf
1993 Dave Stockton

Franklin Showdown Classic
1992 Orville Moody

Showdown Classic
1991 Dale Douglass
1990 Rives McBee
1989 Tom Shaw
1988 Miller Barber
1987 Miller Barber
1986 Bobby Nichols and Curt Byrum (unofficial)

Shootout at Jeremy Ranch
1985 Miller Barber and Ben Crenshaw (unofficial)
1984 Don January and Mike Sullivan (unofficial)
1983 Bob Goalby and Mike Reid (unofficial)
1982 Billy Casper

Source:

References

Former PGA Tour Champions events
Golf in Utah
Recurring sporting events established in 1982
Recurring sporting events disestablished in 2002
1982 establishments in Utah
2002 disestablishments in Utah